Agromyza is a genus of flies belonging to the family Agromyzidae. The adults of these flies can be recognised by the presence of stridulatory files on the first two abdominal tergites in both males and females. Another useful identifying feature is the halteres which are usually white or yellow, although they are darker in a few tropical species.

The larvae of these flies are mostly leaf miners on a wide range of plants, although a few form galls. Some are economic pests.

See also
 List of Agromyza species

References
 Arthropods of Economic Significance – Agromyzidae of the World

External links
 Agromyza parvicornis , corn blotch leafminer on the University of Florida / Institute of Food and Agricultural Sciences Featured Creatures website
 
 

Agromyzidae
Articles containing video clips
Opomyzoidea genera
Taxa named by Carl Fredrik Fallén